The Sony α37 or Sony Alpha 37 (model name SLT-A37) is a single-lens reflex style digital camera that replaced the SLT-A35 in 2012. However, the Alpha 37 camera features an electronic viewfinder and a translucent mirror. The main advantage of a translucent mirror is that it needn't flip up out of the way when taking a picture in order to expose the sensor, but the camera can focus and capture images simultaneously. Also the viewfinder can be used while video recording or stills/video playback, which is useful for example in bright sunlight. The camera's 15-point autofocus system can be set to single, continuous or automatic and is arranged towards the centre. The 7 fps burst mode is available only in "speed priority" mode but can reach up to 5.5 fps burst rate in combination with any other settings. The A37 is compatible with Sony Bravia Televisions.

Retail packagings and naming conventions

References

External links

37
Cameras introduced in 2012
Live-preview digital cameras